God Is a Twelve-Year-Old Boy with Asperger's is the third album by American stand-up comedian Eugene Mirman. The album was released on October 6, 2009 by Sub Pop.

Track listing
Hello and Several Jokes on Topics Ranging from Elevators to Goofing Around on a Whale Watch — 5:41
My Gas Got Shut Off-Boo! — 2:30
Vancouver, Detroit and Bears! — 3:38
Divisive Online Banner Ads — 1:36
America Is Better Than Abortion — 1:18
The Questionable Polls of Russia Today — 5:22
I Found an iPod — 1:01
The Will to Whatevs Book Tour and an Amazing Boy with Asperger's — 2:52
Classmates.com — 5:07
Sex, ??? AirLIES and Videotape: A Three-Part Radio Play Very Based on a True Story* — 6:41
My Letter to ??? Airlines, Your Postcard to ??? Airlines* — 5:51

*The airline mentioned in these tracks is Delta Air Lines. The airline's name is bleeped out on the tracks.

References

2009 albums
2000s comedy albums
Eugene Mirman albums
Sub Pop albums